Godfrey Richard Graham (born 23 August 1936 in Dublin, Republic of Ireland) is an Irish former cricketer. A right-handed batsman and right-arm fast-medium bowler, he played just once for the Ireland cricket team, a first-class match against Scotland in July 1954.

Graham joined RTÉ Television shortly after it was launched as one of its first lighting cameramen. For the next 40 years, he worked on some of the station's most significant programmes, including Discovery and the visit to Ireland of US President John F. Kennedy.

In 1981, Graham won a Jacob's Award for his role as lighting cameraman on the RTÉ television production of Eugene McCabe's play Winter Music

References

1936 births
Cricketers from Dublin (city)
Jacob's Award winners
Living people
Irish cricketers